Cortinarius semisanguineus is a medium-sized mushroom with a pale brown to ochre cap, and bright blood-red gills. It belongs to the genus Cortinarius, a group collectively known as webcaps. It is found growing in conifer plantations, and has recently been given the fanciful common name of surprise webcap. In the past it has been called the red-gilled webcap.

Taxonomy
This mushroom is placed by some authorities in the genus Dermocybe. Most mycologists retain Dermocybe as merely a subgenus of Cortinarius. The group contains almost 30 species. The species name semisanguineus means 'half blood-red', a reference to the gill colour, as compared with Cortinarius sanguineus which is wholly blood-red.

Description
The cap is campanulate (bell-shaped), and later flattens, but retains a broad umbo (shield-like central boss). It is covered in fine fibrils, and is dry. The stipe is usually the same colour as the cap or paler, and is smooth, or finely fibrillose like the cap. It is long, slim, and cylindrical. Cortinal remnants often left on the stem in this species can be quite fleeting. The gills are adnate, markedly sinuate, and fairly crowded. They are initially blood-red, but turn cinnamon-brown on aging, giving a spore print of the same colour. The flesh is said to smell of radishes, and it is ochre in the stem, but more olive in the cap.

A similar species, Cortinarius phoeniceus has a redder cap, and more distinct red cortinal remnants around the stem.

Distribution and habitat
Cortinarius semisanguineus appears in conifer, or mixed conifer, and birch woods in autumn (fall). It is occasional in Britain, Europe, Scandinavia, and parts of North America. It has a mycorrhizal relationship with birch trees (Betula), and other coniferous softwood trees. It is often abundant under young spruce in plantations on acid soil, appearing from August to November.

Edibility
Cortinarius semisanguineus cannot be recommended for the table as it is suspected of being toxic; it may contain similar poisonous compounds to other species found in the Dermocybe subgenus of Cortinarius, such as C. orellanus and its close relatives.

Other uses
Cortinarius semisanguineus can be used as a dye for textile yarns.

See also
List of Cortinarius species

References

External links
 Videos of Cortinarius semisanguineus on YouTube

Fungi of Europe
semisanguineus
Inedible fungi
Taxa named by Elias Magnus Fries